"I See a Star" (original Dutch title: "Ik zie een ster") was the  entry in the Eurovision Song Contest 1974, performed in English (the first time the Dutch entry was not entirely in Dutch) by Mouth & MacNeal.

The song was composed by Hans van Hemert and written by Gerrit den Braber, a duo with several previous entries to their credit. Lyrically, the song is a love duet, with the singers telling each other that their love has helped them see the world in a new way. The "star" of the title is in other words to be found in one's lover's eyes. A second explanation of the lyrics was later revealed by Mouth when he stated in an interview that the song was about the similarities between falling in love and using cannabis. Musically it is a simple melody, which is embellished by a number of different instruments, including a barrel organ with a collection of puppets on it.

The brightly coloured performance has become a favourite among Contest fans, with the song being selected as one of the non-winning "classics" to appear on the double-CD and double-DVD sets produced to support the Congratulations special of late 2005. At one point in the performance, Mouth in fact played the barrel organ himself – something referenced in the Dutch lyrics ( "then I'll add some organ"). Contest historian and author John Kennedy O'Connor argues in his book The Eurovision Song Contest – The Official History that the "antics" involved in the presentation may ultimately have hurt the song's chances of winning. The winning song at this Contest was "Waterloo" by 's ABBA.

Besides the Dutch and English versions, Mouth & MacNeal also recorded the song in German and French, entitled "Ein goldner Stern" and "L'amour au pas" respectively.

The song was performed twelfth on the night, following 's Jacques Hustin with "Fleur de liberté" and preceding 's Tina Reynolds with "Cross Your Heart". At the close of voting, it had received 15 points, placing third in a field of 17.

It was succeeded as Dutch representative at the 1975 contest by Teach-In with "Ding-A-Dong".

Charts

References

Eurovision songs of the Netherlands
Male–female vocal duets
Irish Singles Chart number-one singles
Eurovision songs of 1974
English-language Dutch songs
Songs written by Hans van Hemert
Decca Records singles
1974 singles
1974 songs
Mouth & MacNeal songs